Michel Cosson (4 August 1931 – 11 June 2022) was a French businessman. A prominent figure in motor racing, he was known for aiding the financial recovery of the 24 Hours of Le Mans in the 1990s and the creation of similar competitions abroad.

Biography
Cosson graduated from Supélec in 1955 with a degree in economics. He began his career with ONERA before becoming President of the Club des Nageurs du Mans from 1965 to 1975. He was Director-General of Défense Automobile et Sportive from 1981 to 1993 and of Mutuelles du Mans from 1986 to 1992.

When Cosson became President of ACO in 1992, it was facing major difficulties. He collaborated with local and regional authorities to implement agreements on the repayment of debt. In 2001, a Syndicat Mixte took over the circuit's installations, therefore saving the 24 Hours of Le Mans event.

In the early 1990s, the Fédération Internationale de l'Automobile (FIA) decided to end the World Sportscar Championship. This led the ACO to require its own recruitment of car manufacturers. After great pressure, the FIA  and the ACO created the FIA World Endurance Championship in 2012.

After discussions with Don Panoz, Cosson created the Petit Le Mans in 1998. This race was the starting point for the American Le Mans Series, which was followed by the birth of the European Le Mans Series and the Asian Le Mans Series. After discussions with Claude Michy, the French motorcycle Grand Prix was raced at Le Mans beginning in 2000. At a local level, Michel Cosson created the departmental commissions of the ACO.

Michel Cosson died on 11 June 2022 at the age of 90.

Distinctions
Knight of the Ordre national du Mérite
Knight of the Ordre des Palmes académiques

References

1931 births
2022 deaths
20th-century French businesspeople
21st-century French businesspeople
French motorsport people
Knights of the Ordre national du Mérite
Chevaliers of the Ordre des Palmes Académiques
Supélec alumni